Martin Šaban (born 26 December 1987) is a Croatian football forward currently playing for Gaj Mače.

Career
He had a spell at Austrian lower league side Ilzer SV.

Honours

Individual
Croatian Cup Top goalscorer: 2020–21

References

External links
 

Martin Šaban at Sportnet.hr 

1987 births
Living people
Footballers from Zagreb
Association football forwards
Croatian footballers
NK Varaždin players
NK Bjelovar players
NK Croatia Sesvete players
NK Pomorac 1921 players
NK Slaven Belupo players
NK Rudeš players
NK Krka players
NK Vrapče players
Croatian Football League players
First Football League (Croatia) players
Slovenian PrvaLiga players
Austrian 2. Landesliga players
Austrian Landesliga players
Croatian expatriate footballers
Expatriate footballers in Slovenia
Croatian expatriate sportspeople in Slovenia
Expatriate footballers in Austria
Croatian expatriate sportspeople in Austria